Meth is a feature-length documentary on drug abuse among gay men, released February 9, 2006. Paul Morris was a primary producer; Todd Ahlberg was the director.

References

External links

2006 films
American documentary films
Documentary films about drugs
2006 LGBT-related films
2006 documentary films
Documentary films about LGBT topics
2000s American films